The 2016–17  Zenit Saint Petersburg season was the 92nd season in the club's history and its 21st consecutive season in the Russian Premier League.

Season Events
Prior to the start of the season, 24 May 2016, Mircea Lucescu replaced André Villas-Boas as manager of Zenit, following the expiry of Villas-Boas' contract.

Squad

Out on loan

Zenit-2

Transfers

Summer

In:

Out:

Winter

In:

Out:

Competitions

Russian Super Cup

Russian Premier League

Results by round

Matches

League table

Russian Cup

UEFA Europa League

Group stage

Knockout stage

Squad statistics

Appearances and goals

|-
|colspan="14"|Players away from the club on loan:
|-
|colspan="14"|Players who left Zenit St.Petersburg during the season:

|}

Goal Scorers

Disciplinary record

Notes

References

FC Zenit Saint Petersburg seasons
Zenit Saint Petersburg
Zenit St.Petersburg